Western astrology is the system of astrology most popular in Western countries. Western astrology is historically based on Ptolemy's Tetrabiblos (2nd century CE), which in turn was a continuation of Hellenistic and ultimately Babylonian traditions.

Western astrology is largely horoscopic, that is, it is a form of divination based on the construction of a horoscope for an exact moment, such as a person's birth as well as location (since time zones may or may not affect a person's birth chart), in which various cosmic bodies are said to have an influence. Astrology in western popular culture is often reduced to sun sign astrology, which considers only the individual's date of birth (i.e. the "position of the Sun" at that date).

Astrology is a pseudoscience and has consistently failed experimental and theoretical verification.

Core principles

A central principle of astrology is integration within the cosmos. The individual, Earth, and its environment are viewed as a single organism, all parts of which are correlated with each other. Cycles of change that are observed in the heavens are therefore reflective (not causative) of similar cycles of change observed on earth and within the individual. This relationship is expressed in the Hermetic maxim "as above, so below; as below, so above", which postulates symmetry between the individual as a microcosm and the celestial environment as a macrocosm.

As opposed to Sidereal astrology, Western astrology evaluates a persons birth based on the alignments of the stars and planets from the perspective on earth instead of in space.

At the heart of astrology is the metaphysical principle that mathematical relationships express qualities or 'tones' of energy which manifest in numbers, visual angles, shapes and sounds – all connected within a pattern of proportion. An early example is Ptolemy, who wrote influential texts on all these topics. Al-Kindi, in the 9th century, developed Ptolemy's ideas in De Aspectibus which explores many points of relevance to astrology and the use of planetary aspects.

The zodiac

The zodiac is the belt or band of constellations through which the Sun, Moon, and planets move on their journey across the sky. Astrologers noted these constellations and so attached a particular significance to them. Over time they developed the system of twelve signs of the zodiac, based on twelve of the constellations through which the sun passes throughout the year, those constellations that are "Enlightened by the mind". Most western astrologers use the tropical zodiac beginning with the sign of Aries at the Northern Hemisphere vernal equinox always on or around March 21 of each year.  The Western Zodiac is drawn based on the Earth's relationship to fixed, designated positions in the sky, and the Earth's seasons.  The Sidereal Zodiac is drawn based on the Earth's position in relation to the constellations, and follows their movements in the sky.

Due to a phenomenon called precession of the equinoxes (where the Earth's axis slowly rotates like a spinning top in a 25,700-year cycle), there is a slow shift in the correspondence between Earth's seasons (and calendar) and the constellations of the zodiac. Thus, the tropical zodiac corresponds with the position of the earth in relation to fixed positions in the sky (Western Astrology), while the sidereal zodiac is drawn based on the position in relation to the constellations (sidereal zodiac).

The twelve signs

In modern Western astrology the signs of the zodiac are believed to represent twelve basic personality types or characteristic modes of expression. The twelve signs are divided into four elements fire, earth, air and water. Fire and air signs are considered masculine, while water and earth signs are considered feminine. The twelve signs are also divided into three qualities, also called modalities, Cardinal, fixed and mutable.

Note: these are only approximations and the exact date on which the sign of the sun changes varies from year to year.
Zodiac sign for an individual depends on the placement of planets and the ascendant in that sign. If a person has nothing placed in a particular sign, that sign will play no active role in their personality. On the other hand, a person with, for example, both the sun and moon in Cancer, will strongly display the characteristics of that sign in their make up.

Sun-sign astrology

Newspapers often print astrology columns which purport to provide guidance on what might occur in a day in relation to the sign of the zodiac that included the sun when the person was born. Astrologers refer to this as the "sun sign", but it is often commonly called the "star sign". These predictions are vague or general; so much so that even practicing astrologers consider them of little to no value on their own. Experiments have shown that when people are shown a newspaper horoscope for their own sign along with a newspaper horoscope for a different sign, they judge them to be equally accurate on the average. Other tests have been performed on complete, personalized horoscopes cast by professional astrologers, and have shown no correlation between the horoscope results and the person it was cast for.

The planets

In modern Western astrology the planets represent basic drives or impulses in the human psyche. These planets differ from the definition of a planet in astronomy in that the Sun, Moon, and recently, Pluto are all considered to be planets for the purposes of astrology. Each planet is also said to be the ruler of one or two zodiac signs. The three outer planets (Uranus, Neptune, Pluto) have each been assigned rulership of a zodiac sign by astrologers. Traditionally rulership of the signs was, according to Ptolemy, based on seasonal derivations and astronomical measurement, whereby the luminaries being the brightest planets were given rulership of the brightest months of the year and Saturn the coldest furthest classical planet was given to the coldest months of the year, with the other planets ruling the remaining signs as per astronomical measurement. It is noteworthy that the modern rulerships do not follow the same logic.

Classical planets

The astrological 'planets' are the seven heavenly bodies known to the ancients. The Sun and Moon, also known as 'the lights', are included as they were thought to act like the astronomical planets. Astrologers call inner planets Mercury, Venus and Mars, the 'personal planets', as they represent the most immediate drives. The 'lights' symbolise respectively the existential and sensitive fundamentals of the individuality.

The following table summarizes the rulership by the seven classically known planets of each of the twelve astrological signs, together with their effects on world events, people and the earth itself as understood in the Middle Ages.

Modern modifications to the Ptolemaic system

Additional planets
These are the planets discovered in modern times, which have since been assigned meanings by Western astrologers.

Sidereal and tropical astrology

There are two camps of thought among western astrologers about the "starting point", 0 degrees Aries, in the zodiac. Sidereal astrology uses a fixed starting point in the background of stars, while tropical astrology, used by the majority of Western astrologers, chooses as a starting point the position of the Sun against the background of stars at the Northern hemisphere vernal equinox (i.e. when the Sun position against the heavens crosses over from the southern hemisphere to the northern hemisphere) each year. The consequence of the Tropical approach is that when we say the Sun or a planet is in a certain zodiac sign, observation of it in the sky will show that it does not lie within that constellation at all.

As the Earth spins on its axis, it "wobbles" like a top, causing the vernal equinox to move gradually backwards against the star background, (a phenomenon known as the Precession of the equinoxes) at a rate of about 30 degrees (one Zodiacal sign length) every 2,160 years. Thus the two zodiacs would be aligned only once every 26,000 years. They were aligned about 2,000 years ago when the zodiac was originally established.

This phenomenon gives us the conceptual basis for the Age of Aquarius, whose "dawning" coincides with the movement of the vernal equinox across the cusp from Pisces to Aquarius in the star background.

The moon's nodes

Also important in astrology are the moon's nodes. The nodes are where the moon's path crosses the ecliptic. The North, or Ascending Node marks the place where the moon crosses from South to North (or ascends), while the South, or Descending Node marks where the moon crosses from North to South (or descends). While Lunar nodes are not considered by Western astrologers to be as important a factor as each of the planets, they are thought to mark sensitive areas that are worth taking into account.

 – North or ascending Node. Also the ruler of Pathways and Choices.
 – South or descending Node. Also the ruler of Karma and the Past.

Essential dignity
In astrology, "essential dignity" is the strength of a planet or point's zodiac position, judged only by its position by sign and degree, what the pre-eminent 17th-century astrologer William Lilly called "the strength, fortitude or debility of the Planets [or] significators." In other words, essential dignity seeks to view the strengths of a planet or point as though it were isolated from other factors in the sky of the natal chart. Traditionally, there are five dignities: domicile and detriment, exaltation and fall, triplicity, terms, and face. However, the later two have diminished in usage. A planet's domicile is the zodiac sign over which it has rulership.

The horoscope

Western astrology is based mainly upon the construction of a horoscope, which is a map or chart of the heavens at a particular moment. The moment chosen is the beginning of the existence of the subject of the horoscope, as it is believed that the subject will carry with it the pattern of the heavens from that moment throughout its life. The most common form of horoscope is the natal chart based on the moment of a person's birth; though in theory a horoscope can be drawn up for the beginning of anything, from a business enterprise to the foundation of a nation state.

Interpretation
In Western horoscopic astrology the interpretation of a horoscope is governed by:
The position of the planets in the astrological signs of the zodiac,
The position of the planets in the houses of the horoscope,
The position of the primary angles of the horoscope, namely the horizon line (called the ascendant/descendant axis), and the prime vertical line (called the zenith/midheaven and nadir/imum coeli axis),
The angles formed by the planets relative to each other and the primary angles, called aspects
The position of deduced astronomical entities, such as the Lunar nodes.

Some astrologers also use the position of various mathematical points such as the Arabic parts.

The primary angles

There are four primary angles in the horoscope (though the cusps of the houses are often included as important angles by some astrologers).

 - The ascendant or rising sign is the eastern point where the ecliptic and horizon intersect.  During the course of a day, because of the Earth's rotation, the entire circle of the ecliptic will pass through the ascendant and will be advanced by about 1°. This provides us with the term rising sign, which is the sign of the zodiac that was rising in the east at the exact time that the horoscope or natal chart is calculated. In creating a horoscope the ascendant is traditionally placed as the left-hand side point of the chart. In most house systems the ascendant lies on the cusp of the 1st house of the horoscope.

The ascendant is generally considered the most important and personalized angle in the horoscope by the vast majority of astrologers. It signifies a person's awakening consciousness, in the same way that the Sun's appearance on the eastern horizon signifies the dawn of a new day. Due to the fact that the ascendant is specific to a particular time and place, it signifies the individual environment and conditioning that a person receives during their upbringing, and also the circumstances of their childhood. For this reason, the ascendant is also concerned with how a person has learned to present themself to the world, especially in public and in impersonal situations.

The opposite point to the ascendant in the west is the descendant, which denotes how a person reacts in their relationships with others. It also show the kind of person we are likely to be attracted to, and our ability to form romantic attachments. In most house systems the descendant lies on the cusp of the 7th house of the horoscope.

 - The midheaven or medium coeli is the point on the ecliptic that is furthest above the plane of the horizon. For events occurring where the planes of the ecliptic and the horizon coincide, the limiting position for these points is located 90° from the ascendant. For astrologers, the midheaven traditionally indicates a person's career, status, aim in life, aspirations, public reputation, and life goal. In quadrant house systems the midheaven lies on the cusp of the 10th house of the horoscope.

The opposite point to the midheaven is known as the imum coeli. For astrologers the nadir or IC traditionally indicates the circumstances at the beginning and end of a person's life, their parents and the parental home, and their own domestic life. In quadrant house systems it lies on the cusp of the 4th house of the horoscope.

The houses

The horoscope is divided by astrologers into 12 portions called the houses. The houses of the horoscope are interpreted as being 12 different spheres of life or activity. There are various ways of calculating the houses in the horoscope or birth chart. However, there is no dispute about their meanings, and the 12 houses

Many modern astrologers assume that the houses relate to their corresponding signs, i.e. that the first house has a natural affinity with the first sign, Aries, and so on.

Aspects

The aspects are the angles the planets make to each other in the horoscope, and also to the ascendant, midheaven, descendant and nadir. The aspects are measured by the angular distance along the ecliptic in degrees and minutes of celestial longitude between two points, as viewed from the earth. They indicate focal points in the horoscope where the energies involved are given extra emphasis. The more exact the angle, the more powerful the aspect, although an allowance of a few degrees each side of the aspect called an orb is allowed for interpretation. The following are the aspects in order of importance:

 - Conjunction 0° (orb ±10°). The conjunction is a major point in the chart, giving strong emphasis to the planets involved. The planets will act together to outside stimulus and act on each other.
 - Opposition 180° (orb ±10°).  The opposition is indicative of tension, conflict and confrontation, due to the polarity between the two elements involved. Stress arises when one is used over the other, causing an imbalance; but the opposition can work well if the two parts of the aspect are made to complement each other in a synthesis.
 - Trine 120°(orb ±7.5°). The trine indicates harmony, and ease of expression, with the two elements reinforcing each other. The trine is a source of artistic and creative talent, but can be a 'line of least resistance' to a person of weak character.
 - Square 90°(orb ±7.5°). The square indicates frustration, inhibitions, disruption and inner conflict, but can become a source of energy and activation to a person determined to overcome limitations.
 - Sextile 60°(orb ±5°). The sextile is similar to the trine, but of less significance. It indicates ease of communication between the two elements involved, with compatibility and harmony between them.
 - Quincunx 150°(orb ±2.5°). The quincunx indicates difficulty and stress, due to incompatible elements being forced together. It can mean an area of self-neglect in a person's life (especially health), or obligations being forced on a person. The quincunx can vary from minor to quite major in impact.
 - Semisextile 30° (orb ±1.25°). Slight in effect. Indicates an area of life where a conscious effort to be positive will have to be made.
 - Semisquare 45°(orb ±2.5°).  Indicates somewhat difficult circumstance. Similar in effect to semisextile.
 - Sesquiquadrate 135°(orb ±2.5°).  Indicates somewhat stressful conditions. Similar to semisextile.
 - Quintile 72° (orb ±1.25°).  Slight in effect. Indicates talent and vaguely fortunate circumstances.
 - Biquintile 144° (orb ±1.25°).  Slight in effect. Indicates talent and vaguely fortunate circumstances.
 - Retrograde: A planet is retrograde when it appears to move backwards across the sky when seen from the earth. Although it is not an aspect, some astrologers believe that it should be included for consideration in the chart. Planets which are retrograde in the natal chart are considered by them to be potential weak points.

Astrology and science

The majority of professional astrologers rely on performing astrology-based personality tests and making relevant predictions about the remunerator's future. Those who continue to have faith in astrology have been characterised as doing so "in spite of the fact that there is no verified scientific basis for their beliefs, and indeed that there is strong evidence to the contrary".

Astrology has not demonstrated its effectiveness in controlled studies and has no scientific validity, and as such, is regarded as pseudoscience. There is no proposed mechanism of action by which the positions and motions of stars and planets could affect people and events on Earth that does not contradict well understood, basic aspects of biology and physics.

Where astrology has made falsifiable predictions, it has been falsified. The most famous test was headed by Shawn Carlson and included a committee of scientists and a committee of astrologers. It led to the conclusion that natal astrology performed no better than chance.

See also

Zodiac
Astrological symbols
Astrological signs
List of asteroids in astrology
Chinese zodiac
Circle of stars
Cusp (astrology)
Elements of the zodiac
Natal astrology
Synoptical astrology
Tarotscope

Notes

References

Bibliography

External links
The Astrotest - An account of a test of the predictive power of astrology, with references to other experiments.

 
Astrology
History of astrology
Astrology by tradition
Pseudoscience